The Mealla Formation is a geological formation of the Santa Bárbara Subgroup, part of the Salta Group in the Salta Basin in northwestern Argentina whose strata date back to the Middle to Late Paleocene of the Paleogene.

Description 
The Mealla Formation comprises sandstones ranging upward to siltstones with a basal conglomerate bed. The formation unconformably overlies the Yacoraite Formation and is overlain by the Thanetian Maíz Gordo Formation. The formation is the lowermost unit in the Santa Bárbara Subgroup, representing the post-rift phase of the Salta Basin. The Mealla Formation was deposited in a fluvial environment. Other parts of the formation contain freshwater stromatolites, interpreted as deposited in a shallow lacustrine environment.

The conglomeratic section also contains paleosols. The pollen analysis performed by Quattrocchio et al. in 1997 indicated a phase of higher aridity during the deposition of the Mealla Formation.

The formation was initially described as Riochican, and later as Itaboraian, but after the redefinition of the Itaboraí Formation to Early Eocene, the Mealla Formation is Peligran to Riochican in age. The Mealla Formation is correlated with the Río Loro Formation that crops out in the Sierras Pampeanas to the southeast of the Salta Basin.

Fossil content 
The following fossils were reported from the formation:
 Mammals
Notoungulata
 Archaeogaia macachaae
 Notoungulata - Henricosborniidae	
 Simpsonotus major
 S. praecursor
 Reptiles
 Pelomedusidae indet.
 Sebecus ayrampu
 Pollen
 Aquifoliaceae
 Gemmatricolpites subsphaericus
 Haloragaceae
 Myriophyllumpollenites sp.
 Oenotheraceae
 Corsinipollenites menendezii
 Pandanaceae
 Pandaniidites texus
 Salicaceae
 Rousea patagonica
 Ulmaceae (Phyllostylon)
 Verrustephanoporites simplex

See also 
 South American land mammal ages
 Itaboraí Formation

References

Bibliography 

 
 
 
 

Geologic formations of Argentina
Paleocene Series of South America
Paleogene Argentina
Selandian Stage
Thanetian Stage
Peligran
Riochican
Sandstone formations
Siltstone formations
Conglomerate formations
Fluvial deposits
Lacustrine deposits
Formations
Fossiliferous stratigraphic units of South America
Paleontology in Argentina
Geology of Jujuy Province